Janakiraman is a 1997 Tamil-language comedy drama film directed by Sundar C. The film stars Sarathkumar and Nagma whilst Rambha, Goundamani and Manivannan play supporting roles. The film was one among 1997 Deepavali releases and became a commercial success as well.

Plot
Janakiraman and his brother are nephews of R. Sundarrajan, Sunderajan is a devotee of Lord Hanuman and trains the two brothers to live as bachelors and not to interact with girls.

Meanwhile, Manivannan, who plays another uncle, wants to get his two daughters married to the two brothers. So when Sunderajan goes out of town, Manivannan dresses up as Hanuman and comes to Janakiraman's bedroom and advices him to get married. He even tells him that the girl will arrive at Hanuman temple wearing the outfits of a colour he had suggested.

Mani then gets his daughters to dress up according to the colour combination however Janakiraman gets confused switches the colour combination of the blouse and meets Indhu instead.

Indhu is not happy living with her sisters because her two brothers-in-law want to marry her as their second wife to grab her property. So Janakiraman and Indhu plans to get married; and on the wedding day Anandaraj sets up a duplicate bride (to be switched with Indhu) Meanwhile, Mani arranges the marriage of one of his daughter with Janakiraman (with the same idea as Anandaraj) to be held on the same day and in the same wedding hall as Janakiraman and Indhu's wedding. So all the four girls (Indhu, Mani's two daughters, and the duplicate bride) wear exactly similar sarees, their faces covered with hanging flowers, get switched. The confusion somehow brings Janakiraman and Indhu together and they get married; which disappoints Manivannan and Anandaraj.

Janakiraman and Indhu's life is short-lived after a woman named Gayathri arrives and claims to be Janakiraman's first wife. Indhu believes it to be true and assumes Janaki for betraying her. After much confusion when confronted by Janaki, Gayathri narrates her real reason for her act.

During her childhood, her mother was forced to indulged in prostitution for money but she falls ill in her old age. In order to cure her mother, she had to accept Anandraj's order to wreak havoc in Janaki's life by pretending as his wife. In the climax, Indhu and Gayatri gets abducted by the villains and will be saved by Janaki.

Gayathri whose mother's health is cured leaves the place. Sundarrajan who had been a bachelor till then marries a Malayalam-speaking woman.

Cast
Sarathkumar as Janakiraman
Nagma as Indhu
Rambha as Gayathri
Ponnambalam
R. Sundarrajan
Anandaraj 
Manivannan 
Goundamani 
Senthil
Roopa Sree as Lalitha

Production
Portions of the film were shot in Gobichettipalayam, Erode. During the making of the film, it was alleged that Sarath Kumar and Nagma were seeing each other. Furthermore, it was alleged that Nagma and Rambha were uncomfortable with each other's presence in the film.

Music
The music was composed by Sirpy.

Reception
Indolink Tamil wrote "this movie has plenty of laughs and fast pacing music. Both Sundar C. and Sirpy have done an excellent job. They should be credited for their work."

References

1997 films
1990s Tamil-language films
Films directed by Sundar C.
Indian comedy-drama films
Films scored by Sirpy
1997 comedy-drama films